Bethany Anne Lind is an American stage and screen actor best known for playing Grace Young in Ozark, Molly Quinn in Reprisal and Leigh in Blood On Her Name. On stage, she played Margo in Carapace and Olivia in 26 Miles, both at Alliance Theater, and Dora in "The Storytelling Ability of a Boy" at Florida Stage. In May 2009, her musical theater performance on opening night in "Junie B. Jones and a Little Monkey Business" was called "a treat to watch" by the Atlanta Journal-Constitution. 

On screen, she played Quinn Shinn in the television film Mean Girls 2, was the romantic lead in the film Crackerjack produced by Jeff Foxworthy, and played the lead role of Leigh Tiller in the film Blood on Her Name.

Filmography

Film

Television

References

External links
 

American stage actresses
Living people
21st-century American actresses
American film actresses
Actresses from Atlanta
1985 births